This is a list of earthquakes in 1959. Only magnitude 6.0 or greater earthquakes appear on the list. Lower magnitude events are included if they have caused death, injury or damage. Events which occurred in remote areas will be excluded from the list as they wouldn't have generated significant media interest. All dates are listed according to UTC time. Generally the year experienced below normal seismic activity with 10 magnitude 7.0+ events. The largest was a magnitude 7.9 which struck Russia in May. August was an interesting month mainly owing to a magnitude 7.3 earthquake which struck Yellowstone National Park. This resulted in 28 of the 94 deaths during 1959. Most of the deaths in fact were in August as Taiwan and Mexico were struck by events which caused 16 and 25 deaths respectively.

Overall

By death toll 

 Note: At least 10 casualties

By magnitude 

 Note: At least 7.0 magnitude

Notable events

January

February

March

April

May

June

July

August

September

October

November

December

References

1959
 
1959